= Cobza oil field =

Black Sea oil field

Cobza
- Country: Romania
- Region: Black Sea
- Block: Pelican
- Offshore/onshore: offshore
- Operator: Sterling Resources

Field history
- Discovery: 2010
- Start of development: 2014
- Start of production: 2015

Production
- Current production of oil: 3,000 barrels per day (~1.5×10^{5} t/a)
- Estimated oil in place: 15.5 million tonnes (~ 18.0×10^{6} m^{3} or 113 million bbl)

The Cobza oil field is an oil field located on the continental shelf of the Black Sea. It was discovered in 2010 and developed by Sterling Resources. It will begin production in 2015 and will produce oil. The total proven reserves of the Cobza oil field are around 113 million barrels (15.5 million tonnes), and production is centered on 3,000 barrels per day (480 m^{3}/d).
